Otto Gollnhuber (9 February 1924 – 23 June 1963) was an Austrian footballer. He competed in the men's tournament at the 1952 Summer Olympics. He died in a car accident in 1963.

References

External links
 
 
 

1924 births
1963 deaths
Austrian footballers
Austria international footballers
Olympic footballers of Austria
Footballers at the 1952 Summer Olympics
Place of birth missing
Association football forwards
Road incident deaths in Austria
Kapfenberger SV players